The following is a list of the exports of China. 

Data is for 2022, in billions of US$, as reported by the Observatory of Economic Complexity. The top thirty exports are listed.

See also
List of exports of the United States
List of exports of France
List of exports of India

References
 atlas.media.mit.edu - Observatory of Economic complexity - Products exported by China (2012)

Foreign trade of China
Exports
China